Elizabeth Punsalan or Swallow (born January 9, 1971) is an American former competitive ice dancer. With her husband Jerod Swallow, she is a five-time U.S. national champion, two-time Skate America champion, and competed twice in the Winter Olympics.

Personal life 
Elizabeth Punsalan was born in Syracuse, New York. Her father, Ernesto, moved from the Philippines to the United States as a medical student and became a surgeon. She married Jerod Swallow in September 1993. Her younger brother, Ricky, was charged in the death of their father, who was fatally stabbed on February 4, 1994, but he was found mentally unfit to stand trial.

Career 
Early in her career, Punsalan competed with Christopher Rettstatt. They placed 8th at the 1989 U.S. Championships.

Punsalan began skating with Swallow in mid-1989. They were initially coached by Sandy Hess in Colorado Springs, Colorado. They placed 7th at 1989 Skate America and 5th at the 1990 U.S. Championships. The following season, they won their first U.S. national title. They were one of the favorites for the 1992 Olympic team but at the 1992 U.S. Championships, Swallow fell during the free dance and they finished in third. Swallow was ready to leave competition for show skating but she persuaded him to continue.

In 1992, Punsalan/Swallow began working with Igor Shpilband for choreography in Detroit. By the 1993–94 season, he had become their head coach. The couple developed a rivalry with Renee Roca / Gorsha Sur, who had earlier choreographed a program for them and trained alongside them. The U.S. had a single berth to the ice dancing event at the 1994 Winter Olympics. Punsalan and Swallow were involved in a letter-writing campaign to Congress to prevent Sur from receiving expedited citizenship, which would allow him to compete at the 1994 Olympics. At the U.S. Championships in January 1994, Punsalan/Swallow placed first in the original dance, ahead of their injured rivals in second. Roca/Sur withdrew before the free dance and Punsalan/Swallow went on to win their second national title and were named to the Olympic team. They competed at the 1994 Olympics only two weeks after her father's death, finishing 15th.

Punsalan/Swallow won silver at the 1995 U.S. Championships behind Roca and Sur but finished ahead of them the following year to take their third national title. Punsalan/Swallow won another two national titles at the 1997 and 1998 U.S. Championships. They placed 7th at the 1998 Winter Olympics and 6th at the 1998 World Championships.

Punsalan/Swallow ended their eligible career in 1998 and continued to skate in shows for a number of years. Punsalan became a coach at the Detroit Skating Club in Bloomfield Hills, Michigan.

Results
(with Jerod Swallow)

(with Christopher Rettstatt)

References

Sportspeople from Syracuse, New York
American female ice dancers
Olympic figure skaters of the United States
Figure skaters at the 1994 Winter Olympics
Figure skaters at the 1998 Winter Olympics
1971 births
Living people
American sportspeople of Filipino descent
21st-century American women